Luis Arturo Gómez Torres (born 28 May 1984) is a Mexican boxer who competed from 2003 to 2016.

Professional career
Arturo won a ten round decision over Sandro Marcos and then lost to undefeated Mikey Garcia.

WBC Mundo Hispano title
On 17 July 2010, Gómez beat Alexis Salinas to win the WBC Mundo Hispano lightweight title.

He has gone the distance with José Emilio Perea, Pedro Navarrete, Óscar Larios, Víctor Manuel Cayo, Juan Carlos Batista, Michael Farenas, and José Alfaro.

References

External links

Boxers from Mexico City
Lightweight boxers
1984 births
Living people
Mexican male boxers